DeRon Charles Jenkins (born November 14, 1973) is a former American football cornerback in the National Football League (NFL) and Arena Football League (AFL). He was drafted by the Baltimore Ravens in the second round of the 1996 NFL Draft. He played college football at Tennessee. Jenkins also played for the San Diego Chargers, Tennessee Titans, Austin Wranglers and Nashville Kats. He is currently a co-host of HGTV's Flip or Flop Nashville.

Professional football career

Baltimore Ravens
Jenkins was drafted by the Baltimore Ravens in the second round of the 1996 NFL Draft. He spent four years for the Ravens starting 30 of 63 games, recording 202 tackles, two interceptions and a sack.

San Diego Chargers
Before the 2000 season, Jenkins signed with the San Diego Chargers. He spent one season with the Chargers starting 14 of 15 games, recording 55 tackles and one interception.

Tennessee Titans
After a year in San Diego Jenkins signed with the Tennessee Titans for the 2001 season. During his only year with the Titans he started 6 of 15 games and recorded 41 tackles.

Austin Wranglers
After spending three years out of football he signed with the Austin Wranglers of the Arena Football League in 2004. He spent one season for the Wranglers, recording 54 tackles and two interceptions.

Nashville Kats
Before the 2005 season he signed with the Nashville Kats. He spent two seasons with the Kats recording 84 tackles and four interceptions.

Post-football
Jenkins is a licensed general contractor who has been renovating houses throughout Nashville and Atlanta. He is a co-host with real estate broker Page Turner on HGTV's Flip or Flop Nashville which premiered in January 2018.

References

External links
Arena football stats

1973 births
American football cornerbacks
Austin Wranglers players
Baltimore Ravens players
Flip or Flop (franchise)
Living people
Nashville Kats players
Players of American football from St. Louis
San Diego Chargers players
Tennessee Titans players
Tennessee Volunteers football players